Monsanto Canada Inc. was the Canadian division of now-defunct Monsanto Company, headquartered in Winnipeg, Manitoba. In addition to seed products, Monsanto sold herbicides including Roundup. The global headquarters of Monsanto was located in the American city of St. Louis.

In October 2008, Monsanto Canada was named one of "Canada's Top 100 Employers" by Mediacorp Canada Inc., and was featured in Maclean's newsmagazine.  

Monsanto was acquired by Bayer in 2016 after which Monsanto Canada was amalgamated into Bayer's Canadian agricultural division.

References

External links
 Monsanto Canada - Official Website
Defunct companies based in Winnipeg
Canadian subsidiaries of foreign companies
Agriculture companies of Canada
Defunct companies of Manitoba
Monsanto
Agricultural organizations based in Manitoba